The Irish Connection is the twelfth studio album by Australian-born Irish singer and composer Johnny Logan; credited to himself and Friends. The album was released in April 2007. The album peaked at number one in Norway and Sweden.

Track listing

Charts

Certifications

See also
 List of number-one singles and albums in Sweden
 List of number-one albums in Norway

References

Johnny Logan (singer) albums
2007 albums
Covers albums